is a public university in Kōfu, Yamanashi Prefecture, Japan. The university was established in 2005 as a result of the merger of Yamanashi College of Nursing and Yamanashi Women's Junior College.

Undergraduate Program
 School of International Policy 
Department of General Policy
Department of International Communication
School of Human welfare 
Department of Community Welfare
Department of human formation
School of Nursing 
Department of Nursing

Graduate Program
Graduate School of Nursing
Department of Nursing

References

External links
Official website 
Official website 

Educational institutions established in 2005
Public universities in Japan
Universities and colleges in Yamanashi Prefecture
2005 establishments in Japan
Kōfu, Yamanashi